Vana Tallinn (Literal translation: "Old Tallinn") is an Estonian brand of liqueur manufactured continuously by Liviko since 1960. The recipe contains Jamaican rum and a variety of herbs and spices.

Vana Tallinn is typically served on the rocks but may also be used for cocktails, food, coffee or mulled wine.

History

The recipe for Vana Tallinn (45% vol) was invented in 1960 by the master distiller Ilse Maar, the bottling manager Bernhard Jürno and the distillery specialist Jaan Siimo. Vana Tallinn (45% vol) was the only drink in the Vana Tallinn product family until 1999, with liqueurs with an alcohol content of 40% and 50% vol added at a later time. More than 115 million bottles of Vana Tallinn liqueur have been sold since the production began in 1960.

As of 2022, Vana Tallinn liqueur is sold in 60 countries around the world. In 2018 Liviko announced they started to export Vana Tallinn to Spain, and in 2019 to India.

Products
Vana Tallinn liqueurs:

Vana Tallinn 40% (80 proof)
Vana Tallinn 45% (90 proof)
Vana Tallinn 50% (100 proof)

Vana Tallinn Cream liqueurs:
 Vana Tallinn Original Cream
 Vana Tallinn Chocolate Cream
 Vana Tallinn Ice Cream 
 Vana Tallinn Marzipan Cream
 Vana Tallinn Coconut

Other variants:
 
Vana Tallinn Glögi (glogg)
Vana Tallinn Winter Spice (35% or 70 proof) - this liqueur has been produced since November 2012. It is based on Vana Tallinn liqueur with the addition of cinnamon, cardamom, anise and nutmeg.
Vana Tallinn Heritage Edition (40% or 80 proof)
Vana Tallinn Wild Spices – contains more spices than classic Vana Tallinn: a blend of peppers, star anise and ginger have been added. Produced since 2018.
Vana Tallinn Signature
Vana Tallinn Elegance – ultra premium class liqueur that sees the original Vana Tallinn recipe blended with select rum aged in oak casks from Martinique.
 Vana Tallinn Coffee Fusion
 Vana Tallinn Dark Liquorice
 Vana Tallinn Spritz - carbonated cocktail drink, low-alcohol beverage that combines the flavour nuances of the classic Vana Tallinn, lemon and sparkling water.

Vana Tallinn Grand Prix 
Vana Tallinn Baltic Sommelier Grand Prix is an annual sommelier competition to find the best sommelier in the Baltic States (Estonia, Latvia and Lithuania). The competition was named after Vana Tallinn. Sommelier competition has been organized since 2006 by Liviko in cooperation with the Sommelier Associations of Estonia, Latvia and Lithuania. Finalists of the competition undertake a series of skill tests including blind tasting, decanting, serving wine, food matching and correcting mistakes on a wine list.

Awards 
 The Spirits International Prestige 2010 – 1st place
 The International Wine and Spirit Competition 2010 – 1st place
 The best alcoholic beverage of Estonia 2011 – Vana Tallinn Heritage
 The best alcoholic beverage of Estonia 2013 – Vana Tallinn Winter Spice
 The best alcoholic beverage of Estonia 2014 – Vana Tallinn Signature
 The International Wine and Spirit Competition 2014 – 2nd place, Vana Tallinn Signature
 The Spirits International Prestige 2015 – 1st place
 IWSC 2015 Silver – Vana Tallinn 40
 The Spirits International Prestige 2017 – 1st place Vana Tallinn 40
 The International Wine and Spirit Competition 2017 – 2nd place, Vana Tallinn 40
 Consumers’ Choice Award SIP – 2017 Vana Tallinn 40
 The International Wine and Spirit Competition 2017 – 1st place, Vana Tallinn Elegance
 Estonia’s best alcoholic drink 2019 - Vana Tallinn Wild Spices

References

External links

 Liviko product description

1960 establishments in Estonia
Products introduced in 1960
Chocolate liqueurs
Cream liqueurs
Estonian brands
Estonian alcoholic drinks
Soviet brands
Culture in Tallinn